Levy Adcock (born November 12, 1988) is an American football offensive tackle who is a free agent. He played college football for Oklahoma State University, and was recognized as a consensus All-American. He was signed by the Dallas Cowboys as an undrafted free agent following the 2012 NFL Draft.

Early years
Adcock was born in Claremore, Oklahoma.  He attended Sequoyah High School in Claremore, and he played football, baseball and basketball for the Sequoyah Eagles.  He was the first player in Rogers County history to be named all-county in each sport. He helped lead Claremore Sequoyah to their first ever state championship in football. That team went 14-0.

College career
Adcock originally attended Northeastern Oklahoma A&M College, but transferred to Oklahoma State and played for the Oklahoma State Cowboys football team from 2009 to 2011.  He spent his first year with the Cowboys mainly on special teams, but would occasionally line up as a fourth tight end.  In 2010, he became a starter and was a first-team All Big 12 selection after not allowing a quarterback sack during the entire season.  Following his senior season in 2011, he was a first-team All-Big 12 selection for the second consecutive year, and was recognized as a consensus first-team All-American.

Professional career
Adcock went undrafted in the 2012 NFL Draft but was signed as a free agent by the Dallas Cowboys.

Adcock played for the Saskatchewan Roughriders, having signed a contract in May 2014.

References

External links
 Oklahoma State Cowboys bio
 Saskatchewan Roughriders bio

1988 births
Living people
All-American college football players
American football offensive tackles
Canadian football offensive linemen
Players of Canadian football from Oklahoma
Dallas Cowboys players
Oklahoma State Cowboys football players
Saskatchewan Roughriders players
BC Lions players
Sacramento Mountain Lions players
New York Giants players
People from Claremore, Oklahoma
Players of American football from Oklahoma
Northeastern Oklahoma A&M Golden Norsemen football players